Maidenbower is an electoral division of West Sussex in the United Kingdom, and returns one member to sit on West Sussex County Council. The current County Councillor, is Robert Lanzer who won the seat in a by-election after the resignation of the former Leader of West Sussex County Council Henry Smith upon being elected as Member of Parliament for Crawley.

Extent
The division covers the neighbourhoods of Maidenbower and the southern part of Pound Hill, which form part of the urban area of the town of Crawley.

It falls entirely within the un-parished area of Crawley Borough and comprises the following borough wards: Maidenbower Ward and the western part of Pound Hill South & Worth Ward.

Election results

2013 Election
Results of the election held on 2 May 2013:

2010 By-Election
Results of the election held on 7 October 2010:

2009 Election
Results of the election held on 4 June 2009:

The division came into existence as the result of a boundary review recommended by the Boundary Committee for England, the results of which were accepted by the Electoral Commission in March 2009.

References
Election Results - West Sussex County Council

External links
 West Sussex County Council
 Election Maps

Electoral Divisions of West Sussex